Asbecesta is a genus of leaf beetle from the family Chrysomelidae.

Species 
The following species are accepted within Asbecesta:

 Asbecesta abdominalis Jacoby, 1895 
 Asbecesta beinearti Laboissière, 1938 
 Asbecesta biplagiata Jacoby, 1895 
 Asbecesta breviuscula Weise, 1904 
 Asbecesta bryanti Wilcox, 1972
 Asbecesta capensis Allard, 1888 
 Asbecesta carinata Laboissière, 1931 
 Asbecesta commoda Weise, 1906 
 Asbecesta congoensis Laboissière, 1929 
 Asbecesta costalis Weise, 1912 
 Asbecesta cyanipennis Harold, 1877 
 Asbecesta dimidiaticornis Jacoby, 1903 
 Asbecesta feai Laboissière, 1937
 Asbecesta festiva Laboissière, 1919 
 Asbecesta fulvicornis Jacoby, 1895 
 Asbecesta fulviventris Weise, 1895 
 Asbecesta gyldenstolpei Weise, 1924 
 Asbecesta hintzi Weise, 1901 
 Asbecesta icterica Weise, 1902 
 Asbecesta ituriensis Weise, 1924 
 Asbecesta laeta Weise, 1905 
 Asbecesta lesnei Laboissière, 1931 
 Asbecesta marginata Jacoby, 1899 
 Asbecesta monardi Laboissière, 1931 
 Asbecesta nigripennis Weise, 1909 
 Asbecesta nigripes Bryant, 1958 
 Asbecesta ornata Jacoby, 1900 
 Asbecesta ornaticollis Jacoby, 1900 
 Asbecesta pectoralis Jacoby, 1895 
 Asbecesta perplexa Allard, 1888 
 Asbecesta pilifera Weise, 1909 
 Asbecesta polita Jacoby, 1899 
 Asbecesta punctata Laboissière, 1919 
 Asbecesta punctipennis Bryant 
 Asbecesta purpurea Laboissière, 1937 
 Asbecesta purpureipennis Bryant, 1959 
 Asbecesta quadripustulata Laboissière, 1940
 Asbecesta robusta Weise, 1912 
 Asbecesta rugosa Jacoby, 1895 
 Asbecesta ruwensorica Weise, 1912 
 Asbecesta sobrina Weise, 1905 
 Asbecesta terminalis Weise, 1901 
 Asbecesta verticalis Laboissière, 1937 
 Asbecesta vicina Weise, 1903 
 Asbecesta wittei Laboissière, 1939

References 

Galerucinae
Chrysomelidae genera
Beetles described in 1877
Taxa named by Edgar von Harold